Jeffrey Charles Rohrer (born December 25, 1958) is a former American football linebacker in the National Football League (NFL) for the Dallas Cowboys. He played college football at Yale University and was drafted in the second round of the 1982 NFL Draft.

Early life and collegiate career
Rohrer attended Mira Costa High School, where he played football. He was a National Football Foundation and Hall of Fame Scholar-Athlete. In 2014 Rohrer was inducted into Mira Costa's Distinguished Alumni Hall of Fame, in the same group of inductees as musician Jim Lindberg and scientist Lance J. Dixon.

He attended Yale University. In 1978, he was a backup defensive end. He did not attend school in 1979.

In 1980, he was moved to inside linebacker and helped his team win the Ivy League championship. He registered 110 tackles (second on the team), 54 solo tackles, 8 tackles for loss, 2 sacks and 2 forced fumbles. He suffered a fractured ankle and missed the last 3 games of the season.

In 1981 as a senior, he posted 136 tackles (school record), 71 solo tackles, 4 tackles for loss, one sack and one interception, while receiving  All-Ivy League and All-New England honors. The team shared the Ivy League championship, tying Dartmouth College with a 9-1 overall record, and was briefly ranked in the nation’s top 20, with three of its players selected in the 1982 NFL Draft.

Professional career
Rohrer was selected by the Dallas Cowboys in the second round (53rd overall) of the 1982 NFL Draft, which at the time was considered a reach by the media. As a rookie, he played in 8 games on the special teams units. The next year in addition to special teams, he played on the short-yardage and goal line defenses.

In 1984, he was the backup at middle linebacker, until being moved to outside linebacker when Billy Cannon Jr. suffered a neck injury. The next year, he replaced Anthony Dickerson as the starting right outside linebacker, posting 54 tackles and 1.5 sacks.

In 1986, he registered 111 tackles (second on the team), 2 sacks, 4 forced fumbles (led the team) and one fumble recovery. In 1987, he was replaced on passing downs, but still managed 74 tackles (third on the team), 4 sacks (led the linebackers) and 2 fumble recoveries. During training camp in 1988, he was hospitalized with a bulging disc in his lower back, which required season ending surgery.

In 1989, with the arrival of head coach Jimmy Johnson, he was released before the season started, as part of a youth movement. During his time with the Cowboys, he was considered a tough and outspoken player.

Personal life
On November 18, 2018, Rohrer and Joshua Ross were married. His marriage made him the first NFL player, former or current, to enter into a same-sex marriage. Rohrer was formerly married to Heather Rohrer, with whom he had two children.

See also
Homosexuality in American football

References

External links
'Old' Jeff Rohrer Hopes to Impress the New Cowboys
IVY LEAGUERS IN THE N.F.L.
Mrs. Bond website 

1958 births
Living people
Sportspeople from Manhattan Beach, California
Players of American football from California
American football outside linebackers
Yale Bulldogs football players
Dallas Cowboys players
Gay sportsmen
American LGBT sportspeople
LGBT people from California
LGBT players of American football
Mira Costa High School alumni